The Marcellini Millions is a 1917 American drama silent film directed by Donald Crisp and written by George Beban and Edith M. Kennedy. The film stars George Beban, Helen Jerome Eddy, Pietro Sosso, Henry Woodward, Fred Huntley and Mae Gaston. The film was released on May 14, 1917, by Paramount Pictures.

A print is preserved in the Museum of Modern Art collection.

Plot

Cast 
George Beban as Guido Bartelli
Helen Jerome Eddy as Antoinetta Bartelli
Pietro Sosso as Leo Marcellini
Henry Woodward as Wade Crosby
Fred Huntley as Mr. Hargrave
Mae Gaston as Nancy Harris
W.H. Bainbridge as E.J. Waring
Eugene Pallette as	Mr. Murray
Adele Farrington as Mrs. Murray

References

External links 
 
 

1917 films
1910s English-language films
Silent American drama films
1917 drama films
Paramount Pictures films
Films directed by Donald Crisp
American black-and-white films
American silent feature films
1910s American films